Robert L. Simpson (April 20, 1930 – November 28, 2007) was a professional Canadian football player for the Ottawa Rough Riders, and was elected to the  Canadian Football Hall of Fame in 1976. He was an IRFU all-star at four different positions throughout his career and was a two-time Grey Cup champion, winning with Ottawa in 1951 and 1960. He also represented Canada in basketball at the 1952 Summer Olympics in Helsinki.

He was the Rough Riders nominee for the Schenley Most Outstanding Player in 1956, Schenley Most Outstanding Canadian Award three times, and was Most Outstanding Canadian runner-up in 1956. Over his career with the Rough Riders, Simpson caught 274 passes for 6,034 yards and 65 touchdowns. On defense, he recorded 18 interceptions for 192 return yards and three touchdowns while on punt returns, he had 53 returns for 376 yards (7.1 yard average) and one touchdown. He was the first Rough Riders player to record 1000 receiving yards in a season, doing so in 1956.

He was named to the Ottawa Sports Hall of Fame in 1967 and the Windsor/Essex County Sports Hall of Fame Museum in 1982.

Simpson represented Wellington Ward on Ottawa City Council from 1960 to 1963.

Olympic Basketball

He was part of the Canadian basketball team that competed in the 1952 Summer Olympics which was eliminated after the group stage in the 1952 tournament. He played five matches.

References

1930 births
2007 deaths
Basketball players at the 1952 Summer Olympics
Canadian Football Hall of Fame inductees
Canadian football wide receivers
Canadian men's basketball players
Deaths from cancer in Ontario
Deaths from prostate cancer
Olympic basketball players of Canada
Ontario Rugby Football Union players
Ottawa city councillors
Ottawa Rough Riders players
Politicians from Windsor, Ontario
Players of Canadian football from Ontario
Basketball players from Windsor, Ontario
Canadian sportsperson-politicians
Basketball players from Ottawa